Mossberg model 464 is a lever action repeating rifle manufactured since 2008 by the Mossberg firearms company.  The style is that of traditional lever-action rifles popular since the 19th Century.  It comes in two calibers: .30-30 and .22 LR

Specifications 
464 .30-30
 Total length: 38.5 inches
 Weight: 6.7 lbs
 Barrel length: 20 inches
 Twist: 1 turn in 10"
 Caliber: 30-30 Winchester
 Magazine: tubular, seven round capacity (one in the chamber and six in the magazine)
 Finish: Blued Steel and Wood

464 .22 LR
 Total length: 35.75 inches
 Weight: 5.6 lbs
 Barrel length: 18 inches
 Twist: 1 turn in 16"
 Caliber: .22 LR
 Magazine: tubular, 13 round capacity
 Finish: Blued Steel and Wood

References 

 Picture and information

Rifles of the United States
Lever-action rifles
464